The BMW M3 DTM is a DTM touring car constructed by the German car manufacturer BMW. It was developed in 2010 and has been raced in DTM seasons since their return to the sport after 20 years absence in 2012 until the end of 2013 season before it was succeeded by BMW M4 DTM. It was designed by BMW chief engineer Dominic Harlow. The M3 DTM was based on E92 production car.

History
BMW began development, design and construction of the BMW M3 DTM in October 2010 alongside the announcement of BMW return to DTM for 2012 season. The first chassis was assembled in mid-2011, with the first vehicle completed in late 2011.

Engine

The BMW P66 engine in the BMW M3 DTM generates approx. 480 bhp with the air restrictor specified in the technical regulations.

Debut
With the homologation of the M3 DTM completed on March 1, 2012, the car's race debut was at the 2012 Hockenheimring DTM round on April 29, 2012.

Achievements
As of 2017, BMW M3 DTM scored ten victories, nine poles, seven fastest laps, two constructor title and one driver titles (courtesy of Bruno Spengler in 2012).

References

External links
BMW M3 DTM page on bmw-motorsport.com (Archived)
BMW profile on DTM.com

M3 DTM E92
Deutsche Tourenwagen Masters cars